Gauermann is a German surname. People with that name include:
 Jakob Gauermann (1773–1843), German painter and engraver
 Friedrich Gauermann (1807–1862), son of Jakob, Austrian painter